Nine Eagles State Park is a  state park in Decatur County, Iowa, United States, near the city of Davis City. The park is located within a hilly area of the state and includes a  lake.

The park offers  of hiking trails through forest and prairie landscapes, including a  trail around the lake. It also has a  horse trail that is open to snowmobiles in the winter. The lake has a beach along with amenities for fishing and boating, including a boat ramp, a jetty, and five smaller docks. Fish species in the lake include bluegill, channel catfish, and largemouth bass. The park has three developed campgrounds with electric and non-electric campsites along with a family cabin and primitive equestrian campsites.

References

External links

State parks of Iowa
Protected areas of Decatur County, Iowa